Berkovitsa Municipality is a municipality (obshtina) in Montana Province, Northwestern Bulgaria, located in the area of the so-called Fore-Balkan to the northern slopes of the western Stara planina mountain. It is named after its administrative centre - the town of Berkovitsa.

Todorini Kukli peak, is located in the southeastern part of the area almost on the very border with Varshets Municipality.

Settlements 

Berkovitsa Municipality includes the following 20 places (towns are shown in bold):

Demography 
The following table shows the change of the population during the last four decades.

Religion 
According to the latest Bulgarian census of 2011, the religious composition, among those who answered the optional question on religious identification, was the following:

Economy

Transportation

Berkovitsa has a terminus railway station. It is connected to Montana and has access to the railway connecting Vidin and Vratsa. There is infrequent passenger traffic.

See also
Provinces of Bulgaria
Municipalities of Bulgaria
List of cities and towns in Bulgaria

References

External links
 Official website 

Municipalities in Montana Province